Labor Zionism or socialist Zionism refers to the left-wing, socialist variation of Zionism. For many years, it was the most significant tendency among Zionists and Zionist organizations, and was seen as the Zionist sector of the historic Jewish labor movements of Eastern Europe and Central Europe, eventually developing local units in most countries with sizable Jewish populations. Unlike the "political Zionist" tendency founded by Theodor Herzl and advocated by Chaim Weizmann, Labor Zionists did not believe that a Jewish state would be created by simply appealing to the international community or to powerful nations such as the United Kingdom, Germany, or the former Ottoman Empire. Rather, they believed that a Jewish state could only be created through the efforts of the Jewish working class making aliyah to the Land of Israel and raising a country through the creation of a Labor Jewish society with rural kibbutzim and moshavim, and an urban Jewish Proletariat.

Before 1914, the growing alienation from Bolshevism on the one hand and the unification of the Jewish Labor Movement in Ottoman Palestine on the other hand made it possible for Zionism to gain a measure of recognition and legitimacy, particularly in the United States. The Labor Zionists differed from other labor organizations at the time since non-Zionist labor organizations were internationalist, therefore opposed to Jewish nationalism. The leadership of the Jewish left in the U.S. was drawn only from two distinct sources: the internationalist and cosmopolitan line of thought of the founding father who arrived in the 1880s, and the Jewish Labor Bund veterans who left the Russian Empire after 1905 and saw no contradiction between socialism and nationalism within the Jewish diaspora.

By the 1930s, the Labor Zionist movement had substantially grown in size and influence, and eclipsed "political Zionism" both internationally and within the British Mandate of Palestine; Labor Zionists predominated among many of the institutions of the Yishuv, particularly the trade union federation known as the Histadrut. The Haganah, the largest Yishuv paramilitary, was a Labor Zionist organization; on occasion, it partook in military action (such as during The Saison) against certain radical right-wing Jewish political opponents and militant groups, sometimes in cooperation with the British Mandate administration.

Labor Zionists played a leading role in the 1947–1949 Palestine War, and had a dominant presence among the leadership of the Israel Defense Forces for decades after the independence of the State of Israel during the 1948 Arab–Israeli War.

Major theoreticians of the Labor Zionist movement included Moses Hess, Nachman Syrkin, Ber Borochov, and Aaron David Gordon; and leading figures in the movement included David Ben-Gurion, Golda Meir, and Berl Katznelson.

Ideology 
Moses Hess's 1862 work Rome and Jerusalem. The Last National Question argued for the Jews to settle in Palestine as a means of settling the national question. Hess proposed a socialist state in which the Jews would become agrarianized through a process of "redemption of the soil" that would transform the Jewish community into a true nation in that Jews would occupy the productive layers of society rather than being an intermediary non-productive merchant class, which is how he perceived European Jews.

Ber Borochov, continuing from the work of Moses Hess, proposed the creation of a socialist society that would correct the "inverted pyramid" of Jewish society. Borochov believed that Jews were forced out of ordinary occupations by gentile hostility and competition, using this dynamic to explain Jewish professionals' relative predominance, rather than workers. He argued that Jewish society would not be healthy until the inverted pyramid was righted, and a substantial number of Jews became workers and peasants again. This, he held, could only be accomplished by Jews in their own country.

Jonathan Frankel in his book Prophecy and Politics: Socialism, Nationalism, and the Russian Jews, 1862–1917, states that after 1905, Dov Ber Borochov, a Marxist Zionist and one of the pioneers of the Labor Zionist movement suddenly rejected voluntarism for determinism. Prior to this, Borochov regarded Palestinian colonialization as a preparatory mission to be carried out by an elite vanguard of pioneers; he developed a theory after the revolution of 1905 that indicated how inevitable Palestinian colonization by the Jewish masses was.

Another Zionist thinker, A. D. Gordon, was influenced by the völkisch ideas of European romantic nationalism, and proposed establishing a society of Jewish peasants. Gordon made a religion of work. These two figures (Gordon and Borochov), and others like them, motivated the establishment of the first Jewish collective settlement, or kibbutz, Degania, on the southern shore of the Sea of Galilee, in 1909 (the same year that the city of Tel Aviv was established). Deganiah, and many other kibbutzim that were soon to follow, attempted to realize these thinkers' vision by creating communal villages, where newly arrived European Jews would be taught agriculture and other manual skills.

Joseph Trumpeldor is also considered to be one of the early icons of the Labor Zionist movement in Palestine. When discussing what it is to be a Jewish pioneer, Trumpeldor stated: What is a pioneer? Is he a worker only? No! The definition includes much more. The pioneers should be workers but that is not all. We shall need people who will be "everything" – everything that the land of Israel needs. A worker has his labor interests, a soldier his esprit de corps, a doctor and an engineer, their special inclinations. A generation of iron-men; iron from which you can forge everything the national machinery needs. You need a wheel? Here I am. A nail, a screw, a block? – here take me. You need a man to till the soil? – I’m ready. A soldier? I am here. Policeman, doctor, lawyer, artist, teacher, water carrier? Here I am. I have no form. I have no psychology. I have no personal feeling, no name. I am a servant of Zion. Ready to do everything, not bound to do anything. I have only one aim – creation. Trumpeldor, a Socialist Zionist, died defending the community of Tel Hai in the Upper Galilee in 1920. He became a symbol of Jewish self-defense and his reputed last words, "Never mind, it is good to die for our country" (En davar, tov lamut be'ad artzenu אין דבר, טוב למות בעד ארצנו), became famous in the pre-state Zionist movement and in Israel during the 1950s and 1960s. Trumpeldor's heroic death made him not only a martyr for Zionists Left but also for the Revisionist Zionist movement who named its youth movement Betar (an acronym for "Covenant of Joseph Trumpeldor") after the fallen hero.

Albert Einstein was a prominent supporter of both Labor Zionism and efforts to encourage Jewish–Arab cooperation. Fred Jerome in his Einstein on Israel and Zionism: His Provocative Ideas About the Middle East argues that Einstein was a Cultural Zionist who supported the idea of a Jewish homeland but opposed the establishment of a Jewish state in Palestine "with borders, an army, and a measure of temporal power." Instead, he preferred a bi-national state with "continuously functioning, mixed, administrative, economic, and social organizations." However, Ami Isseroff in his article Was Einstein a Zionist argues that Einstein was not opposed to the state of Israel given that Einstein declared it "the fulfillment of our dreams." Perceiving its vulnerability after independence, he again set aside his pacifism in the name of human preservation, when president Harry Truman recognized Israel in May 1948. In the November 1948 presidential election Einstein supported former vice-president Henry A. Wallace’s Progressive Party, which advocated a pro-Soviet foreign policy – but which also at the time (like the USSR) strongly supported the new state of Israel. Wallace went down to defeat, winning no states.

Parties 

"Two Zionist labor parties were established in Palestine in late 1905 by party organization veterans in the pale of settlement, one socialist who was "Palestine's Jewish Social Democratic Labor Party"; the other radical, "Ha-poel Ha-Tsair." In theory, shaping the ideologies that had to generalize long-term strategic policy and day-to-day tactics from an overarching world view was the role of the group. But in fact, without the assistance of the parties or even their avowed principles, the experiments that proved to be of decisive importance in the growth of the labor movement were initiated.

Although each party formed its own newspaper, neither compelled its contributors to pursue its own line of thinking. On the contrary, Ha-ahdut, and still More, Ha-poel Ha-tsair, represented the highly individualistic, disorganized and even anarchic essence of the second Aliya in their pages.

Initially two labor parties were founded by immigrants to Palestine of the Second Aliyah (1904–1914): the pacifist and anti-militarist Hapo'el Hatza'ir (Young Worker) party and the Marxist Poale Zion party, with Poale Zion roots. The Poale Zion Party had a left wing and a right wing. In 1919 the right wing, including Ben-Gurion and anti-Marxist non-party people, founded Ahdut HaAvoda. In 1930 Ahdut HaAvoda and Hapo'el Hatza'ir fused into the Mapai party, which included all of mainstream Labor Zionism. Until the 1960s these parties were dominated by members of the Second Aliyah.

The Left Poale Zion party ultimately merged with the kibbutz-based Hashomer Hatzair, the urban Socialist League and several smaller left-wing groups to become the Mapam party, which in turn later joined with Shulamit Aloni’s Ratz to create Meretz.

The Mapai party later became the Israeli Labor Party, which for a number of years was linked with Mapam in the Alignment. These two parties were initially the two largest parties in the Yishuv and in the first Knesset, whilst Mapai and its predecessors dominated Israeli politics both in the pre-independence Yishuv and for the first three decades of Israel's independence, until the late 1970s.

Decline and transformation 

A close relationship formed between the labor movement and the liberal leftist branch of General Zionism, and between the labor movement and the section of the Zionist leadership that bore direct responsibility for the Zionist enterprise, prior to the fourteenth Zionist Congress that met in Vienna in August 1925. Ze'ev Sternhell in his book “The Founding Myths of Israel: Nationalism, Socialism, and The Making of the Jewish state” states there was a close relationship with Arthur Ruppin, a Zionist historian and leader who, though in theory advocating capitalist agriculture, refused to entrust market forces with the production of agricultural settlements.

Already in the 1920s the Labor movement disregarded its socialist roots and concentrated on building the nation by constructive action. According to Tzahor its leaders did not "abandon fundamental ideological principles". However, according to Ze'ev Sternhell in his book The Founding Myths of Israel, the labor leaders had already abandoned socialist principles by 1920 and only used them as "mobilizing myths".

The middle class allowed itself the freedom to stand aside and avoid any involvement in the political life of the Yishuv and the Zionist movement because the nationalist socialism in Palestine served to protect the private sector, They never felt the need for a single political system parallel with the Histradrut. The middle class's shortcomings emerged from the lack of any existential need to formulate an alternative to the ideology of the workforce.

In the 1930s for Jews living in a restricted manner facing various assimilation issues as well immense poverty in the United States, the Labor Zionism movement influenced some of their socialist ideals that some of them had hoped to live in. Jews in New York, during the Great Depression were attracted to socialism echoed through the liberalism of Roosevelt New deal. Beth Wenger, illustrates the reactions of Jewish women to the economic downturn, their contribution to the family economy, and the general tendency to adhere only to the style of a wage-working husband in the American middle class. Deborah Dash Moore concludes in her book "At home in America", the generation influenced by such socialist ideals reconstructed Jewishness, molded it to suit a middle-class American mode, adapted it to the rigors of urban life, imbued it with Jewish feelings learned from their immigrant parents, and added it to the Jewish history chain.

Following the 1967 Six-Day War several prominent Labor Zionists created the Movement for Greater Israel which subscribed to an ideology of Greater Israel and called upon the Israeli government to keep and populate all areas captured in the war. Among the public figures in this movement associated with left-wing nationalism were Rachel Yanait Ben-Zvi, Yitzhak Tabenkin, Icchak Cukierman, Zivia Lubetkin, Eliezer Livneh, Moshe Shamir, Zev Vilnay, Shmuel Yosef Agnon, Isser Harel, Dan Tolkovsky, and Avraham Yoffe. In the 1969 Knesset elections it ran as the "List for the Land of Israel", but failed to cross the electoral threshold. Prior to the 1973 elections, it joined the Likud and won 39 seats. In 1976 it merged with the National List and the Independent Centre (a breakaway from the Free Centre) to form La'am, which remained a faction within Likud until its merger into the Herut faction in 1984.

Other prominent Labor Zionists, especially those who came to dominate the Israeli Labor Party, became strong advocates for relinquishing the territory won during the Six-Day War. By the signing of the Oslo Accords in 1993, this became the central policy of the Labor Party under Prime Minister Yitzhak Rabin and Foreign Minister Shimon Peres. What distinguishes Labor Zionism from other Zionist streams today is not economic policy, an analysis of capitalism, or any class analysis or orientation, but its attitude towards the Israeli–Palestinian peace process with modern Labor Zionists tending to support the Israeli peace camp to varying degrees. This orientation towards Israel's borders and foreign policy has dominated Labor Zionist institutions in recent decades to the extent that socialist Zionists who support a Greater Israel ideology are forced to seek political expression elsewhere.

In Israel the Labor Party has followed the general path of other governing social-democratic parties such as the British Labour Party and is now fully oriented towards supporting a capitalist model, and some factions support centrist policies akin to the Third Way, though in the 2010s it has returned to a more social-democratic outlook under the leadership of Shelly Yachimovich and Amir Peretz.

The Israeli Labor Party and its predecessors have ironically been associated within Israeli society as representing the country's ruling class and political elite whereas working-class Israelis have traditionally voted for the Likud since the Begin Revolution of 1977.

Labor Zionism today 
Labor Zionism manifests itself today in both adult and youth organizations. Among adults, the World Labor Zionist Movement, based in Jerusalem, has affiliates in countries around the world, such as Ameinu in the United States and Australia, Associação Moshé Sharett in Brazil and the Jewish Labour Movement in the United Kingdom. Youth and students are served through Zionist youth movements such as Habonim Dror, Hashomer Hatzair and college-age campus activist groups such as the Union of Progressive Zionists of the U.S. and Canada.

Shlomo Avineri, member of the last Labor government, Israeli political scientist, Professor of Political Science at the Hebrew University of Jerusalem who has written on Hegel and translated some of Marx’s early writings recognizes that Zionism is “the most fundamental revolution in Jewish life” and stresses the revolutionary aspect of Zionism. In The Making of Modern Zionism: The Intellectual Origins of the Jewish State, he believes it as a permanent revolution that aims for a radically different and more just society in Israel after creating a new normative and public focus for Jewish Existence. He is out to challenge Zionism's consensus view as a religiously inspired movement sparked by outbreaks of anti-Semitism and to create a rich, diverse intellectual lineage important to the movement today.

In Israel, Labor Zionism has become nearly synonymous with the Israeli peace camp. Usually, Labor Zionist political and educational institutions activists are also advocates of a two-state solution, who do not necessarily adhere to socialist economic views.

See also
 Ameinu ("our people"), US successor to the Labor Zionist Alliance
 Farband, two US Jewish left-wing organizations
 Hashomer Hatzair, left-wing Zionist youth movement
 Hanoar Haoved Vehalomed, left-wing Israeli youth movement
 Habonim Dror, left-wing Zionist youth movement
 Havlagah ("The Restraint"), Haganah's policy of restraint towards Arab enemies
 Hebrew labor or "conquest of labor"
 Histadrut, Israel's national trade union center
 Jewish left, Jews who support left-wing causes
 Kibbutz, collective community in pre-state Palestine and the State of Israel
 Left-wing nationalism
 Movement for Greater Israel
 Partners for Progressive Israel
 Rome and Jerusalem (text at Wikisource), a classic 1862 work on Labor Zionism by Moses Hess
 The Founding Myths of Israel by Zeev Sternhell

References

Further reading

External links 

 A history of labor and socialist zionism
 The Jewish Problem and the Socialist Jewish State
 Ameinu – Liberal Values, Progressive Israel

 
Left-wing nationalism
Jewish nationalism
Types of socialism
Types of Zionism